Return of the Obra Dinn is a 2018 adventure and puzzle video game created by Lucas Pope and published by 3909 LLC. It was Pope's second commercial game, following 2013's Papers, Please, and was first released for macOS and Windows before being ported to Nintendo Switch, PlayStation 4, and Xbox One a year later. Return of the Obra Dinn was praised for its gameplay, art style, and narrative; it won several awards including the Seumas McNally Grand Prize.

The game is set in 1807 with the player assuming the role of insurance inspector for the East India Company. The Obra Dinn, a merchant ship missing for five years, has reappeared off the coast of England with no one alive aboard. The player is dispatched to the ghost ship to perform an appraisal, reconstruct the events of the voyage, and determine the fates of all sixty souls aboard, providing a cause of death for those deceased or a probable current location for those presumed living. Investigation is accomplished through the use of the "Memento Mortem", a pocket watch capable of transporting its user to the moment of death of any corpse located. The game, played in first-person perspective, uses a "1-bit" monochromatic graphical style inspired by games on early Macintosh computers.

Gameplay 

The Obra Dinn, insured by the East India Company, went missing in 1803 as it was to sail around the Cape of Good Hope. It has since washed up in port with all sixty passengers and crew dead or missing. The player is tasked with determining the fate of all souls on board, including their names, where and how they met their fate, who their killer was, and their location should they be alive.

Return of the Obra Dinn is effectively one large logic puzzle. The game is played as a first-person adventure game, allowing the player to fully explore the Obra Dinn, using a monochromatic dithering style to mimic the shading and color methods of early computer games. To help track their progress, the player is given a logbook that includes a drawing of all the crew members, the crew roster, and blueprints of the ship. They are also given the Memento Mortem, a pocketwatch-like device that can be used on a corpse. When activated, the player will hear the events that transpired in the seconds immediately before death, and can then explore the moment of death frozen in time. This is used to identify who was present, to capture moments in other rooms or on other decks, and to make note of details at the scene. These are used to help connect the faces of crewmates to their names and roles. While exploring a moment of death, the player can use the pocketwatch again to enter more corpses captured in the vision.

With each death, the logbook automatically fills in basic information. The player is tasked only with naming those present and accurately describing their cause of death. Naming the crew is done through small clues, inferences, and logical deduction – mainly, narrowing possibilities as the game progresses. The causes of death are selected out of a catalogue, and some deaths will accept more than one solution. The player can revise their logbook as they gain more information, but to deter guesswork, correct "fates" are validated only in sets of three, with the exception of the last six fates discovered in a playthrough, which are validated in pairs.

Plot 
The Obra Dinn, an East Indiaman trade ship, departs from Falmouth to the Orient in 1802 with 51 crewmen and 9 passengers. The ship fails to meet her rendezvous at the Cape of Good Hope, and is declared lost. Five years later, the Obra Dinn reappears off the coast of England with every hand either dead or missing. The East India Company sends its Chief Inspector to determine what happened aboard the ship. The inspector receives a logbook and the Memento Mortem stopwatch from Henry Evans, the ship's surgeon. The stopwatch, when used on a corpse, enables the user to experience and walk around the exact moment of the corpses death, frozen in time. With this and the logbook, the inspector sets out to unravel the fate of all 60 aboard.

The Obra Dinn had launched with a number of passengers, including two royal Formosans and their guards carrying an exquisite treasure chest. Initial calamity struck after launch, with one crew member killed by falling cargo, and two others taken by pneumonia. However, a small group of the crew saw the potential of stealing the Formosan chest and, as they neared the Canary Islands, abducted the royal Formosans and the chest via rowboat and fled. However, three mermaids ambushed the boats, killing most of the group. The mermaids' attack was quelled when a Formosan used a magical shell pulled from the chest to stun the mermaids, but this killed himself as well. The remaining crew member returned to the Obra Dinn, along with the captured mermaids (who also had shells), but he was shot on approach by the surviving Formosan guard. As they were brought aboard, the mermaids attacked and killed more of the crew before they were subdued and locked in the lazarette.

The Obra Dinn circled around to return to England due to the increasing number of deaths. As they started their return, the mermaids caused a terrible storm to strike, and a pair of sea demons mounted on giant spider crabs boarded the ship intent on reaching the lazarette to liberate the mermaids, killing more of the crew before being put down. Shortly after dispelling the first assault, the ship was attacked by a kraken, killing more crewmen and the captain's wife. The captain went to the lazarette and threatened to kill all the mermaids in hopes of ending the attack. He executed two before the final one called off the kraken. The shells and the surviving mermaid were then tossed overboard by one of the Captain's mates, with the mermaid agreeing to guide the ship back to England. The surviving passengers and some of the crew decided to abandon the Obra Dinn and make for the western coast of Africa. Evans, knowing that the East India Company will investigate the ship via the Memento Mortem, purposefully killed his pet monkey inside the locked lazarette, and kept its paw for safekeeping before leaving for Africa with the others. The three remaining crewmen turned on the captain, wanting to reclaim the chest and shells as compensation for their hardships, not knowing they were already thrown overboard. The captain killed the mutineers, and then, next to his wife's body, committed suicide.

Several years later, the insurance inspector is able to catalogue all the deaths on the ship, except those within the locked lazarette. After the inspector leaves the ship, a fierce storm rolls in and the Obra Dinn sinks. The completed logbook is mailed back to Evans, and an insurance report is written, compensating or fining the estates of lost crewmen, depending on their conduct. A year later, Jane Bird, one of the survivors who fled with Evans, mails the book back to the inspector along with the monkey's paw and a letter saying that Evans had died shortly after receiving the logbook back. The Inspector then uses the "Memento Mortem" on the monkey paw in order to deduce what happened in the lazarette, thereby completing the whole story of the "Obra Dinn".

Development
Over the course of his career, American video game designer Lucas Pope had developed an appreciation of "1-bit" graphics used in many early Macintosh games. Following his prior game Papers, Please, Pope had wanted to use the 1-bit aesthetic in an experimental game, leading him to develop a game engine that allowed the player to move in a three dimensional space, rendered in a vintage style. Pope wanted to ensure the game was visually legible from most angles, challenging him on some of the rendering aspects. Separately, he found that while the 1-bit graphics worked fine when displayed in an on-screen window, at full screen resolution, players suffered from motion sickness. Rendering routines were modified to create the equivalent of motion blur for this dithering approach. At one point, Pope had considered creating a cathode ray tube render effect, but opted against this.

With the style in place, Pope worked backwards to determine what game to make. His initial idea was one where the player character repeatedly died; the player would see the events of the death from their corpse, and would then be transported back one minute to manipulate the environment so as to recreate that death. However, Pope found this technically challenging, and instead sparked the idea of using freeze-frame flashbacks depicting moments of death to tell a story.

The game's narrative took the longest portion of development. Pope teased Return of the Obra Dinn in 2014 while completing Papers, Please, anticipating a release the next year. Instead, it took four more years. Pope released a limited demo for the 2016 Game Developers Conference, which had only six fates for the player to deduce. Feedback from this was positive, so he began to expand the game's story more than he expected. Internally, Pope created spreadsheets to link all the various characters and their fates, and to ensure that players would be able to logically follow chains of deaths. This ended with him writing the necessary dialog for some scenes and hiring voice actors, provided by locals Pope auditioned, who could mimic the accents of the time period.

With a more complete story, Pope created a new demo to take to PAX Australia in November 2016, adding thirteen additional characters to the original demo. However, unlike the first demo, the deaths were presented out of chronological order, and players were confused about how to progress. Pope realized this confusion would become worse with the full cast of characters. He found a solution by having ten events in the narrative serve as a catalyst for deaths, breaking the story into sections and allowing the plot to be more digestible to the player. Dividing the game into "chapters" then led to the creation of the logbook, serving as the timeline for the game and cataloguing the ship's crew in the same manner as the real East India Company.

Pope stated he was not worried about how well Return of the Obra Dinn would perform financially, as he was still earning appreciable revenue from Papers, Please. He considered Obra Dinn a passion project and did not pressure himself with deadlines or marketing. Return of the Obra Dinn was released for macOS and Windows computers on October 17, 2018, published by the Japanese-based studio 3909. Versions for the Nintendo Switch, PlayStation 4, and Xbox One, ported by Warp Digital, were released on October 18, 2019. Physical editions were released through Limited Run Games for the PS4 and Nintendo Switch in 2020.

Reception

Return of the Obra Dinn received "generally favorable reviews", according to review aggregator website Metacritic. Polygon Colin Campbell recommended the game, saying "Return of the Obra Dinn takes the whodunit's conventions and twists them into kaleidoscopic narratives that are perplexing and delightful. This isn't merely a great game, it's the work of an intense and creative intelligence." Patrick Hancock for Destructoid commented that Pope had "knocked it out of the park" as a follow up to Papers, Please, and commented that even after finishing the game, he "could not stop thinking about" it. Game Informers Javy Gwaltney called the art style "visually arresting", and praised the pacing and thought put into the game. However, they were less praising of the ending, commenting that the "ultimate payoff fails to complement the thoughtful gameplay".

The game received praise for being unique. Andreas Inderwildi of Rock Paper Shotgun commented that the game was more than just about logical reasoning, but that players were supposed to take into account how humans would act in an emergency. In his review for Eurogamer, Christian Donlan commented that the graphical style in the game made it "feel like no other", and likened it to Sudoku. Gamasutras Katherine Cross praised the game's minimalist feel, and that the characters "came off as people". Tom Marks for IGN described the game as being full of life, despite the use of still images to convey the story.

Some outlets favorably compared the game to Her Story, a similar mystery-driven game where the player must work out the timeline of events and come to conclusions using numerous video clips. Campbell commented that the two games both made him reach for "a notepad and pen", whilst Andrew Webster writing for The Verge commented that both games were about creating clarity even in confusing situations. Webster went on to comment that there were many ways to enjoy the game, that a player could obsessively find the mysteries in the game, or simply enjoy the "grim, shocking story".

Awards
Several video game publications named Return of the Obra Dinn among 2018's best games, including Edge, Polygon, USGamer, GameSpot, The Nerdist, The Daily Telegraph, The New Yorker, and The Escapist. The game also won a series of awards:

References

External links 
 
 

2018 video games
Adventure games
MacOS games
Detective video games
Fiction about mermaids
Occult detective fiction
Independent Games Festival winners
Kraken in popular culture
Nintendo Switch games
Monochrome video games
Mystery video games
PlayStation 4 games
Seumas McNally Grand Prize winners
Video games developed in Japan
Video games set in the 19th century
Video games set in Cornwall
Windows games
Works set on ships
Xbox One games
British Academy Games Award for Game Design winners
The Game Awards winners
Game Developers Choice Award winners
Video games designed by Lucas Pope
Single-player video games